The 2006 World Junior Championships in Athletics is the 2006 version of the World Junior Championships in Athletics. It was held from 15 August to 20 August at the Chaoyang Sports Centre in Beijing, the capital of the People's Republic of China.

The Championships were dominated by the host nation China, and Kenya. The United States showed a near complete domination in the relay events. Estonia won four gold medals; their first medals ever at the World Junior Championships.

Results

Men

Women

Medal table

Participation
According to an unofficial count through an unofficial result list, 1350 athletes from 176 countries participated in the event.  This is in agreement with the official numbers as published.

References

Official results (archived)

 
2006
World Junior Championships in Athletics
World Junior Championships in Athletics
International athletics competitions hosted by China
August 2006 sports events in Asia